Deniliquin Airport  is an airport located  south of Deniliquin, a town in the Riverina region of New South Wales, Australia.

RAAF Station Deniliquin
RAAF Station Deniliquin was formed in 1941 as a station for the Royal Australian Air Force (RAAF), during the Second World War, at the airfield as part of the Empire Air Training Scheme as No. 7 Service Flying Training School.

It was also a final disbanding site for squadrons returning from active duty against the Japanese in the Pacific. No. 22 Squadron RAAF and No. 30 Squadron RAAF were disbanded here in 1946, and in 1945 and 1946 it was also a base for No. 78 Squadron RAAF before it was finally disbanded in Williamtown.

See also
 List of airports in New South Wales

References

Airports in New South Wales
Riverina
Airports established in 1941